The 1969 Cleveland Browns season was the team's 20th season with the National Football League and the last before the 1970 AFL-NFL Merger.

The Browns made it to the 1969 NFL Championship Game, where they fell to the Minnesota Vikings. The 1969 season would be the last year that Cleveland would win a postseason game until 1986. In addition, that victory over Dallas would also be the last time the Browns won a postseason game on the road until the 2020–21 playoffs. This was also the last season in which the Browns made it to the league championship game, as they have failed to reach the Super Bowl after the merger.

Offseason

NFL Draft 
The following were selected in the 1969 NFL Draft.

Personnel

Staff/Coaches

Roster

Preseason 
On August 30, a crowd of 85,532 fans viewed a doubleheader at Cleveland's Municipal Stadium. In the first contest, the Chicago Bears (with All-Pro running back Gale Sayers) played the AFL's Buffalo Bills (with rookie running back O. J. Simpson), while the Cleveland Browns hosted the Green Bay Packers in the second match.

Exhibition schedule

Regular season schedule

Standings

Playoffs

References

External links 
 1969 Cleveland Browns at Pro Football Reference
 1969 Cleveland Browns Statistics at jt-sw.com
 1969 Cleveland Browns Schedule at jt-sw.com
 1969 Cleveland Browns at DatabaseFootball.com

Cleveland
Cleveland Browns seasons
Cleveland Browns